The Northeast Coast campaign of 1747  was conducted by the Wabanaki Confederacy of Acadia against the New England settlements along the coast of present-day Maine below the Kennebec River, the former border of Acadia. during King George's War from July until September 1747. They attacked English settlements on the coast of present-day Maine between Berwick and St. Georges (Thomaston, Maine),  within two months there were 11 raids - every town on the frontier had been attacked. Casco (also known as Falmouth and Portland) was the principal settlement.

Background

After the two attacks on Annapolis Royal in 1744, Governor William Shirley put a bounty on the Passamaquoddy, Mi’kmaq and Maliseet on Oct 20. The following year, during the campaign, on August 23, 1745, Shirley declared war against the rest of the Wabanaki Confederacy – the Penobscot and Kennebec tribes.

In response to the New England expedition against Louisbourg which finished in June 1745, the Wabanaki retaliated by attacking the New England border. New England braced itself for such an attack by appointing a provisional force of 450 to defend the frontier. After the attacks began they increased the number of soldiers by 175 men. Massachusetts established forts along the border with Acadia: Fort George at Brunswick (1715), St. George's Fort at Thomaston (1720), and Fort Richmond (1721) at Richmond. Fort Frederick was established at Pemaquid (Bristol, Maine).

After the Northeast Coast campaign (1745) and 1746), the 1747 followed.

The campaign

Wabanaki Confederacy began their first raid on April 13 at Scarborough, killing two and taking four prisoners.
 
A militia of 50 natives raided Falmouth on April 21, killing cattle and attacking Mr. Frost’s family, taking captive his wife and six children. Despite sending 26 men after then under Captain IIsley, they were unable to catch the native and their prisoners. 
 
Capt. Jordan’s company of 30 was posted from Falmouth to Topsham, leaving the town defenseless.  The natives killed two women and a man.  Crossing the Androscoggin in canoe, natives killed two men and wounded the third, one woman escaped.
 
On 26 May, 100 natives attacked Fort Frederick at Pemaquid. The killed five soldiers, five recruits and the other inhabitants were taken prisoner. 
 
At Damariscotta, natives took one prisoner, killing his wife and child.
 
At Wiscasset, the natives again seized Capt. Jonathan Williamson.
 
At Fort Frederick in early September a company of 60 natives attacked.  Killing five guards and then attacked for two hours and then withdrew. At Fort Georges, natives tried, unsuccessfully, to dig a tunnel into the fort.

Aftermath 

Natives took Frances Noble captive close to Fort Richmond in 1748.  Frances Noble wrote her captivity narrative.

Natives also killed a number of British at Fort St. Georges in the fall of 1748.

See also 
Military history of Nova Scotia
 Northeast Coast campaign (1703)
 Northeast Coast campaign (1723)

References

Sources
 
 
 
 
 

Military history of Acadia
Military history of Nova Scotia
Military history of New England
Military history of Canada
Conflicts in 1747
1747 in the Thirteen Colonies
Pre-statehood history of Massachusetts
New France
Captives of Native Americans
1747 in Massachusetts
Battles of King George's War
Berwick, Maine
Thomaston, Maine